Yangibozor District (Янгибозор тумани) or Yangibazar is a district of Xorazm Region in Uzbekistan. The capital lies at the town Yangibozor. The district consists of 3 urban-type settlements (Yangibozor, Yangi yop, Mangitlar) and 8 rural communities.

References

Xorazm Region
Districts of Uzbekistan